Rookie Cops is a 2022 South Korean web series written by Lee Ha-na, directed by Kim Byung-soo and starring Kang Daniel, Chae Soo-bin, Lee Shin-young, and Park Yoo-na. The series revolves around police academy students enrolled at the elite Korean National Police University. It released two episodes every Wednesday at 17:00 (KST) on Star via Disney+ in select regions as the OTT's first Korean Star Originals drama from January 26, 2022, to March 16, 2022.

Synopsis
Rookie Cops follows the stories of freshmen recruits at the elite Korean National Police University (KNPU), which is said to be one of the most conservative and exclusive campuses in Korea. Wi Seung-hyun (Kang Daniel) is an honors freshman who wants to take after his father. Everything is going according to plan until he encounters Go Eun-kang (Chae Soo-bin). The youth investigation drama depicts the students' dreams, love, challenges, and ambitions.

Cast

Main
 Kang Daniel as Wi Seung-hyun, a passionate youth who cannot stand seeing injustice, he aims to follow in the footsteps of his father who is the head of the Gyeonggi Dongbu Police Agency. He places first on the college entrance exam on his second attempt.
 Chae Soo-bin as Go Eun-kang, is active and courageous, she is a troublemaking freshman who enters the police force to chase after an unrequited love and manages to enter the police university in the face of rejection.
 Oh Ah-rin as young Go Eun-kang.
 Lee Shin-young as Kim Tak, a freshman from the junior national judo team who embodies the spirit and passion of youth, is accustomed to being alone but Wi Seung-hyun becomes his one true friend.
 Choi Yoon-woo as young Kim Tak.
 Park Yoo-na as Gi Han-na, a freshman who is self-reliant and a realist with a unique prideful charm, does not miss on ranking first place in the department. Her individualistic tendency creates tension with other students who value group life.

Supporting

Students
 Park Sung-joon as Yoo Dae-il, a "pure macho" freshman, he considers himself a successful police drama fan because he decided to become an officer after watching Signal and passes the entrance exam after three tries.
 Min Do-hee as Woo Ju-young, a freshman from a science high school who dreams of becoming a forensics investigator.
 Kim Woo-seok as Seo Bum-ju, a sincere and upright freshman who sometimes has excessive thoughts and worries that reveal a timid side, he is meticulous with planning and has unexpected dance skills.
 Cheon Young-min as Shin A-ri, an ulzzang freshman who is interested in fashion and appearance, has a gloomy image but in actuality has a soft personality and gradually grows closer to her classmates.
 Park Yeon-woo as Jang Ju-chan, a fourth-year student, president of the student council, and Go Eun-kang's first love.
 Jung Soo-bin as Baek Sun-yu, head of the female student dormitory is also active in school activities, such as training and student council.
 Kim Seung-ho as Pyo Hyun-suk, the head of public relations at the police academy, is friendly and buys food for the juniors.
 Lee Joon-woo as Um Hyuk, a strict principled upperclassman and the head of the police academy's education team in charge of training new students.
 Seo Bum-june as Choi In-sik.

Faculty
 Kim Sang-ho as Cha Yoo-gon, a witty police science professor who as a police officer had run wild in the past without fear of the world before an incident changed his outlook on life.
 Seo Yi-sook as Kim Soon-young, the university dean.
 Choi Woo-ri as Bang Hee-sun, the charismatic criminal psychology professor.
 Kang Ae-shim as dormitory janitor.

Family
 Son Chang-min as Wi Gi-yong, Wi Seung-hyun's respected father who is a high ranked police officer.
 Ji Soo-won as Oh Sook-ja, Wi Seung-hyun's mother with an extraordinary affection for her son.
 Lee Moon-sik as Go Yang-chul, Go Eun-kang's warmhearted and humorous father.
 Jung Young-joo as Lee Hee-sook, Go Eun-kang's blunt but affectionate mother and owner of a chicken restaurant.
 Son So-mang as Go Mi-kang, Go Eun-kang's older sister and an art graduate student with a pure and honest charm.
 Sa Kang as Gi Han-na's mother.
 Lee Moon-soo as Yoo Dae-il's grandfather.

Others
 Kim Yool-ho as Chu Man-seok, a heinous character who commits evil acts.
 Hyun Woo-sung as Kang Nam-gi, a passionate detective struggling to find the truth of the case.
 Park Ji-hoon as one of the bullies at the billiard hall.
 Lee Woo-je as one of the bullies at the billiard hall.
 Ahn Do Kyu as Hong Yoon-ki, the part-time employee being bullied at the billiard hall.
 Kim Kwon as Jo Han-sol, Asia's young leader and CEO of creative start-up investments.
 Jung Yeo-Jun as Shin Eui-seok, the chief secretary who follows the dire personal life of Korean-American CEO Jo Han-sol.
 Choi Jae-hyun as Min-yong, Wi Seung-hyun's friend.
 Park Sang-hoon as Lee Se-hyun, the fraudster who was a victim of a bigger scheme.
 Lee Se-mi as Min Hae-ji, the flustered woman at the nightclub.

Special appearances
 Kwak Si-yang as Kim Hyun-soo, a fourth-year student at KNPU and Kim Tak's older brother.
 Shin Ye-eun as Jang So-yeon, a freshman who dropped out in the middle of the orientation program.
 Go Youn-jung as the profile picture for Yoo Dae-il's blind date.
 Park Sang-nam as Go Eun-kang's blind date.

Episodes

Production

Development
On December 22, 2020, Studio&NEW disclosed that it would use invested funds and secure secondary copyrights to produce upcoming works, including Rookie Cops. It was first reported on February 1, 2021, that Rookie Cops is an original series that would air on Disney+. On April 30, 2021, the NEW and The Walt Disney Company Korea's five-year content partnership was formalized with Rookie Cops being named as one of the two immediate works part of that deal.

Casting
On February 1 and March 9, 2021, Kang Daniel and Chae Soo-bin were reported to be reviewing the offers, respectively. Their lead roles were not officially confirmed until their appearances at the Disney+ APAC Content Showcase on October 14. In May, there was news of Min Do-hee, Lee Shin-young, Kim Woo-seok, and Shin Ye-eun being cast. The following month, Kim Sang-ho and Park Yoo-na confirmed their casting followed by Sa Kang in July. Kwak Si-yang's special appearance was confirmed in October while the major cast lineup was revealed in November.

Filming
It was reported on May 26, 2021, that filming began in early May following a script reading and concluded in November. On January 25, 2022, footage from the official table read was published.

Release
In addition to South Korea, other Disney+ Star markets with Rookie Cops scheduled for January 26, 2022 included Singapore, Taiwan, Hong Kong, Japan, Australia, and New Zealand. The series aired on the same date for Malaysia, Indonesia, and Thailand via Disney+ Hotstar. Two episodes were released on the premiere date.

Original soundtrack
The special single "Hush Hush (Korean Ver.)" was originally released on September 15, 2021 in the studio album Imaginary as a collaboration between Japanese musician Miyavi and Kang Daniel. The Korean version of the single was released specifically for this series soundtrack on March 9, 2022. The soundtrack was released in its entirety on March 16, 2022.

Part 1

Part 2

Part 3

Part 4

Part 5

Special

Reception

Critical reception 
Prior to its release, Rookie Cops garnered attention for being K-pop idol Kang Daniel's acting debut. It was included in an article titled "A summary of the most talked about TV programs and issues in 2021" by Allure Korea. It was also included in YTN's ranking of the top five most anticipated OTT works for the first half of 2022 and the "30 Upcoming Korean Dramas to Put on Your Watch List in 2022" ranking by Tatler Asia.

Following its release, Rookie Cops repeatedly ranked first among the "Top 10 TV Shows on Disney+" in South Korea. It also occasionally ranked first on this same list in Taiwan while ranking in the top three of this list in Hong Kong, Singapore, and Japan. New Zealand news media website Stuff recommended Rookie Cops as the only Korean drama listed among five different series to watch on Disney+. The series was named by Variety as a contributing factor that helped Disney+ join the top five streamers in Korea. Despite initially airing in select regions, it also ranked seventh in the "Top 10 Most Watched K-Dramas Worldwide on Disney+ in 2022". In an article collecting Rolling Stone India's favorite Korean drama OSTs of 2022, "Because of You" was included in the list of ten with the writer stating that "the singer [Chancellor] enhances the delicate rendition of this lyrical composition, which is excellent in its own right".

Accolades

Notes

References

External links
 
 
 
 
 

Korean-language television shows
2022 South Korean television series debuts
2020s college television series
South Korean web series
South Korean action television series
South Korean college television series
South Korean crime television series
South Korean drama web series
South Korean mystery television series
South Korean romance television series
South Korean pre-produced television series
Star (Disney+) original programming
South Korean police procedural television series
Television series by Next Entertainment World